Princess Pilar of Bavaria (Maria del Pilar Eulalia Antonia Isabella Ludovika Franziska Josepha Rita Euphrasia von Wittelsbach, princess of Bavaria) (March 13, 1891 – January 29, 1987) was the only daughter of Prince Ludwig Ferdinand of Bavaria and his wife Infanta Maria de la Paz of Spain.

Writing
Princess Pilar was the co-author of a 1932 biography, Every Inch a King, about her cousin King Alfonso XIII of Spain. Princess Pilar was also an artist and headed the Bavarian branch of the German Red Cross for 40 years.

She never married and died without issue.

Honours

  : 901st Dame of the Order of Queen Maria Luisa - .

Ancestry

Notes

1891 births
1987 deaths
House of Wittelsbach
Burials at Andechs Abbey